The 128th Maine Senate had 35 members each elected to two-year terms in November 2016. The first regular session was sworn in on December 6, 2016.

The 128th Senate party composition was:
 18 Republicans
 17 Democrats

Leadership

Senators

See also
 List of Maine State Senators

References

External links
 Maine Senate

Maine legislative sessions
2010s in Maine
2016 in Maine
2017 in Maine
2018 in Maine